Kafi's Story is an ethnographic film about life of Nuba ethnic people in Sudan, directed by Amy Hardie and Arthur Howes.

Synopsis
Shot between 1986 and 1988, Kafi's Story captures scenes from the life of Nuba peoples just before they were involved in the Second Sudanese Civil War.

Kafi, a young man from the Torogi village in the Nuba Mountains in Sudan is one of the first men to travel north to the capital Khartoum in search of money. Having money is the only way through to get a dress and to marry a second wife, Tete.

Ten years after this film, Arthur Howes went back to Sudan to shoot the documentary Nuba Conversations, where he wanted to capture the life of Nuba peoples during the war.

Festivals
 Melbourne International Film Festival, Australia (2000)

Awards
 Joris Ivens Award (third place) of IDFA - International Documentary Film Festival Amsterdam, The Netherlands (1989)
 Documentary Award at BBC BP Expo Documentary, England (1990)
 Basil Wright Prize of R.A.I. International Festival of Etnographic Films, England (1990) 
 American Visual Anthropology Award (2000)

Bibliography
 Loizos, Peter, Sudanese Engagements: Three Films by Arthur Howes (1950–2004), Routledge, 2006

External links
Kafi's Story at the Internet Movie Database
Arthur Howes at the Internet Movie Database
Amy Hardie at the Internet Movie Database
Kafi's Story' at California Newsreel
Sudan Update
'Kafi's Story'' at the British Film Institute
University of California' Beverly Art Museum and Pacific Film Archive
History of Cinema in Sudan
Caught in the Crossfire Arthur Howes' article in New Internationalist
Article about Arthur Howes at The Guardian
Nuba Survival Foundation

References

Films shot in Sudan
Anthropology documentary films
1989 films
1989 documentary films
British documentary films